The 2008 NORCECA Beach Volleyball Circuit at Boca Chica was held March 19–24, 2008 in Boca Chica, Dominican Republic. It was the first leg of the NORCECA Beach Volleyball Circuit 2008.

Women's competition

Men's competition

References
 Norceca

Santo Domingo
Beach Volleyball
International volleyball competitions hosted by the Dominican Republic